Festivities of Our Lady of the Remedies is a festival that takes place in the northern Colombian city of Riohacha, Department of La Guajira. The festival takes place between January 20 to February 9 of each year. The events vary from corralejas, street parties to horse races.

The festivities celebrates a legend of the Virgin Mary which dates back to Monday May 14, 1663. Riohacha was apparently subject to a tsunami-like wave, and tradition says the Virgin helped in calming down the inhabitants.

See also 
Our Lady of the Mountain
List of festivals in La Guajira
Festivals in Colombia

References

Patronal festivals in Colombia
Festivals in La Guajira Department